Now That's What I Call Music! 39 was released on August 9, 2011. The album is the 39th edition of the Now! series in the United States. Three tracks on the album, "Last Friday Night (T.G.I.F.)",  "Party Rock Anthem" and "Give Me Everything", reached number one on the Billboard Hot 100.

Now! 39 debuted on the Billboard 200 at number three with first week sales of 110,000 copies.  The album has sold 591,000 copies as of March 2012.

Track listing

Reception

Allmusic reviewer Andy Kellman tells readers that while Now! 39 includes "hyper-energetic party songs" and two songs from solo male country artists (ending a three-volume drought), what is "notable is the absence of songs that could be squarely categorized as rap or R&B." He also points out of the bizarre repeat of "Tonight, Tonight" for the second volume in a row and the peculiar inclusion of "Bass Down Low" among the Now What's Next selections as it "hit the Hot 100 the last week of 2010".

Charts

Weekly charts

Year-end charts

References

External links
 Official U.S. Now That's What I Call Music website

2011 compilation albums
 039
EMI Records compilation albums